The Solomon Islands national netball team represents Solomon Islands in international netball. The team competes mainly in tournaments within Oceania, such as the Pacific Games. Their most competitive result to date is a bronze medal at the 1981 South Pacific Mini Games.

The Solomon Islands was one of two national teams to compete in netball at the 1969 South Pacific Games, finishing second behind Papua New Guinea, but were not awarded a medal.

Competition history

References

External links
 Official webpage

National netball teams of Oceania
Netball